Fakhrabad va Golnad Tariki (also Romanized as Fakhrābād va Golnad Tārīḵī; also known as Fakhrābād) is a village in Anjirabad Rural District, in the Central District of Gorgan County, Golestan Province, Iran. At the 2006 census, its population was 1,395, in 325 families.

References 

Populated places in Gorgan County